Investment Corporation of Bangladesh (ICB) is a statutory corporation of Government of the People's Republic of Bangladesh, established on 1 October 1976 under No. 40 of Investment Corporation of Bangladesh Ordinance, 1976. It is mainly an investment bank operating in Bangladesh, established to accelerate the pace of industrialization and to develop a sound securities market in Bangladesh. ICB is one of the largest investors in share market of Bangladesh. Investing in share market, providing loans and advances, acting as manager/trustee/custodian of mutual funds are some of main activities of ICB. It's the most successful state-owned corporation of Bangladesh in terms of profitability. Classification of shareholders, as on 30 June 2013, shows that Government of the People's Republic of Bangladesh holds 27% of the shares of ICB  and it is enlisted in Dhaka and Chittagong stock exchanges.

Subsidiaries 

After twenty-four years of establishment, the company has brought reform in its strategy and policy for conducting commercial activities by forming and managing several subsidiary companies under the Investment Corporation of Bangladesh (Amendment) Act, 2000 (the Act No. 24 of 2000).

The companies are:
ICB Capital Management Ltd. (ICML)
ICB Asset Management Company Ltd. (IAMCL)
ICB Securities Trading Company Ltd. (ISTCL).

Investment Corporation of Bangladesh Bill, 2014 

In July 2014, a bill titled Investment Corporation of Bangladesh Bill, 2014 was placed by Finance Minister Abul Maal Abdul Muhith in parliament aiming to encourage investment in the country, develop the capital market and collect savings. The move comes as the government looks to have a functional ICB ordinance in place after the Investment Corporation of Bangladesh Ordinance, 1976 was declared illegal due to its issuance during the military regime (1975–1981). Therefore, this bill is aimed to replace the 'Investment Corporation of Bangladesh Ordinance, 1976'.

Milestones

See also 
 Bangladesh Bank
 List of banks in Bangladesh
 Dhaka Stock Exchange
 Chittagong Stock Exchange
 Bangladesh Securities and Exchange Commission

References 

Investment banks
Financial services companies of Bangladesh
Government corporations
Government-owned companies of Bangladesh
Financial services companies established in 1976
Banks established in 1976
Holding companies established in 1976
Investment in Bangladesh
Bangladeshi companies established in 1976
Companies listed on the Dhaka Stock Exchange